Vasily Dmitriyevich Smirnov (born July 28 O.S./August 9 N.S., 1846 in Biryuchya Kosa, Astrakhan Governorate; died May 25, 1922 in Petrograd) was a Russian orientalist, specializing in the history and literature of Turkey.

1846 births
1922 deaths
People from Astrakhan Governorate
Russian orientalists